The T57 heavy tank was an experimental heavy tank developed by the American military during the Cold War era as a further development of the M103 heavy tank. Featuring heavy armor and a long range 120 mm rifled gun, the T57 was supposed to serve as a replacement to the M103 in service with American heavy tank units in Europe. Like the French AMX 50 project, it was to feature an oscillating turret and was also to receive a 153 mm gun. Experiments were also conducted to investigate mounting a 203 mm gun, but this was soon found to be infeasible. When multiple problems were discovered in the turret oscillation system on account of the excess weight of the heavily armored turret and the gun, the project was dropped.

Design

Armament

The T57 was armed with the 120 mm T179 rifled tank gun, a derivative of the T123E1 gun found on the failed T43 tank. The gun was mounted to the T169 mount located inside the vehicle's oscillating turret, which allowed for a maximum of 15 degrees of gun elevation or -8 degrees of depression by shifting the turret structure up and down rather than the gun itself. The T169 featured a hydrospring gun recoil system. The T179 was able to fire a variety of ammunition, including T284 armor piercing (AP) shells, T308 HEP shells, T275 high explosive (HE) and T309 high-explosive anti-tank (HEAT) rounds. The T179 was reloaded by an autoloader system that had an estimated firerate of 30 rounds per minute. Due to the large size of the one-piece ammunition, a maximum of 18 rounds were able to be carried.

Protection
The T57 was well protected for a tank at its time; it featured armor heavier than the M103 heavy tank despite using a hull based on its design. All of the armor of the tank was of cast homogeneous armor. The oscillating turret was the most armored section of the vehicle, with a  plate angled at 60 degrees. The hull of the vehicle retained the iconic rounded cast steel "beak" design of the frontal hull seen on both the M103 and M48 tanks. The armor of the T57 was supposed to provide immunity for the vehicle against all existing Soviet anti-tank weapons at the intended engagement ranges of the vehicle. Heavy emphasis was placed on the turret armor due to the intention for the T57 and other NATO heavy tanks to provide long range fire in hull down positions.

Propulsion
This was however far slower than medium tanks at the time such as the M48 and Soviet T-54/T-55, which could easily reach . A significant downside of the T57 was its very low range of  due to its very inefficient engine, a similar issue that had also befallen the M103.

History

The T57 project was commenced on 12 October 1951 to design a 120 mm armed tank with an oscillating turret and autoloader. The initial design of the autoloader was cylindrical, however this was rejected by the Army Field Forces because such a design would take up an enormous space inside the turret bustle and limit round capacity to a maximum of 11. The Rheem Manufacturing Company was contracted to design and produce two pilot vehicles. However, the T57 was never completed and only two turrets were constructed, with both being mounted on T43 hulls for trials. On January 17 the US Ordinance Committee cancelled the project with both turrets scrapped and the hulls returned to a supply depot for future usage. Another project arose with the T77 120mm Gun Tank, which planned to mount the T57 turret to a M48 Patton tank hull, which was never completed. The failure of the T57 has been attributed to shifting doctrines in tank design at the time, with American designers progressing to the modern concept of main battle tanks that combined the mobility of medium tank, armor and firepower of a heavy tank in a lighter package, rendering heavy tanks obsolete.

In popular culture
The T57 makes an appearance inside the online video game World of Tanks and World of Tanks Blitz as a tier 10 heavy tank.

References

Further reading

Heavy tanks of the Cold War
Heavy tanks of the United States
Abandoned military projects of the United States
Trial and research tanks of the United States